Lhabab Düchen (Tib. ལྷ་བབས་དུས་ཆེན་, Wyl. lha babs dus chen) is one of the four Buddhist festivals commemorating four events in the life of the Buddha, according to Tibetan traditions. Lhabab Düchen occurs on the 22nd day of the ninth lunar month according to Tibetan calendar and widely celebrated in Tibet and Bhutan. The festival is also celebrated in other Buddhist Asian countries including Sri Lanka, Myanmar, Thailand and Laos where it is celebrated a few weeks before the Tibetan and Bhutanese version.

Lhabab Duchen is a Buddhist festival celebrated to observe the Buddha's descent from the Trāyastriṃśa heaven down to earth, one of The Eight Great Events in the Life of Buddha.

According to legend, the Buddha ascended the Trāyastriṃśa heaven temporarily at the age of 41, in order to give teachings to benefit the gods in that desire realm, and to repay the kindness of his mother by liberating her from Samsara.

He was exhorted by his disciple and representative Maudgalyayana to return, and after a long debate and under a full moon agreed to return. He returned to earth a week later by a special triple ladder prepared by Viswakarma, the Hindu-Buddhist god of machines. 

On Lhabab Duchen, the effects of positive or negative actions are multiplied ten million times. It is part of Tibetan Buddhist tradition to engage in virtuous activities and prayer on this day.

See also
 Abhidhamma Day

Notes
During this day, positive or negative actions are multiplied 100 million times.

References

http://www.fpmtabc.org/prayers_mmdays.php
https://fpmt.org/media/resources/dharma-dates/ and select November
Buddhist Art News https://web.archive.org/web/20160304214148/https://buddhistartnews.wordpress.com/2013/12/04/lhabab-duchen-the-day-buddha-descended-from-tushita-heavens/
Legge, James, tran. A Record of Buddhistic Kingdoms. Oxford: Clarendon Press, 1886; reprint, New York: Dover Publications Inc.,1965. Chapter XVII.

External links
 Professing Faith: Story of the Tibetan Buddhist festival of Lhabab Duchen 

Public holidays in Bhutan
Tibetan Buddhist festivals
Festivals in India
Tibetan Buddhist art and culture
November observances
Observances set by the Tibetan calendar